Kwaku Sintim-Misa aka "KSM" (born 1956) is a Ghanaian actor, director, satirist, talk show host, and author. He also has his own shows on radio and television. He is the host of The KSM Show.

Early life
KSM was born the fifth of six siblings on December 5, 1956, in the city of Kumasi. He attended UST Primary School, the Presbyterian Boys' Senior High School, and Prempeh College. After completing college, he received specialized training at the renowned National Film and Television Institute in Accra Ghana.

Anxious for deeper investigation into the performing arts, KSM left Africa to major in acting and directing at Trinity College in Connecticut, United States. He subsequently earned a Master of Fine Arts in film production from New York University.

Career
KSM launched his acting career with a variety of Off-Broadway and Public Theatre roles. He was also featured in the popular American crime series Law & Order and on the drama series Medal of Honor Rag (by the Tony Award winning director Lloyd Richards.) KSM became the first African to stage an original Off-Broadway play when he produced Thoughts of a Confused Black Man, an immensely popular one-man show that raised compelling questions about race in the United States. In 1997, inspired by his American career, he returned to Ghana to make his mark as a proud nationalist and edu-tainer. Shortly after arriving back in the country, KSM became a prominent radio talk show host; his pioneering work with Talk Shop introduced Ghana to broadcasting's potential for generating controversy and dialogue. KSM used a combative, confrontational style which shocked his listeners into frankly discussing relevant national issues. He continued to refine his style with the show Nyame Som Ye De, which inspired Ghanaians to think beyond religion to define their broader spirituality.

After making a name for himself as a radio host, KSM created what has become one of Ghana's most popular talk shows: Thank God It’s Friday (TGIF). TGIF was the first broadcast of its kind to fuse serious talk, education and humor. Since its inception, the show has featured gripping stories from entrepreneurial street vendors, dancing presidents, pioneering scientists, leading artists, and many more exciting characters. KSM recently won the Radio and Television Personality Television Entertainment Show Host of the Year (2011) for his work with TGIF.

Despite broadcast success, KSM has never abandoned the stage. He has written, directed and starred in a series of one man comedic plays, most notably Saga of a Returnee, Afia Siriboe, and Politically Incorrect. KSM's live performances use comical characters to illustrate the key social, economic and political issues concerning Ghana. They are produced by Sapphire Ghana Limited, a content development company that he founded and uses to integrate social issues into television, radio, and stage productions.

In 2009, KSM released his first feature-length film, a psychological thriller entitled Double. He has written and produced a variety of television shows, including Hot Bench, Divorce Court, Action Security, and a number of medical documentaries. Ogya FM is his latest television series, which was created to educate the public on the power of advocating for change. Ogya FM was recently featured at the prestigious Panafrican Film and Television Festival of Ouagadougou in Burkina Faso.

In 2013, he became the mentor of many Ghanaian youth, among them is Promise Edem Nukunu, who is an author and public speaker.

Personal life
Sintim-Misa was born to Rt. Rev. Godfried Kwadwo Sintim-Misa, a former Moderator of the Presbyterian Church of Ghana, and Mary Oforiwaa Sintim-Misa. He is married with four children including rapper Yaw (Blackway).

References

External links and source
Kwaku Sintim-Misa on Ghana Home Page
Kwaku Sintim-Misa onYEN Home Page

Living people
1956 births
Ghanaian male television actors
Ghanaian comedians
People from Kumasi
Prempeh College alumni
Presbyterian Boys' Senior High School alumni